Olga Titova (born 27 September 1980) is a Kyrgyzstani freestyle swimmer. She competed in the women's 4 × 200 metre freestyle relay event at the 1996 Summer Olympics.

References

External links
 

1980 births
Living people
Olympic swimmers of Kyrgyzstan
Swimmers at the 1996 Summer Olympics
Place of birth missing (living people)
Kyrgyzstani female freestyle swimmers